Andrew Barrett may refer to:

 Andrew C. Barrett (born 1940), American attorney
 A. W. Barrett (Andrew Washington Barrett, 1845–1905), Los Angeles businessman
 Andy Barrett, a character from the Australian soap opera Home and Away